Basset is a surname of French origin. Notable people with the surname include:

André Basset (1895–1956), younger brother of the above, linguist, orientalist
Alfred Barnard Basset mathematician
Basset family includes wealthy landowners in Cornwall
David Basset (1687–1701), Merchant active in Newfoundland and New England
Frances Basset, 2nd Baroness Basset
Francis Basset (disambiguation)
Henri Basset (1892–1926), son of the above, linguist and historian
John Basset (writer) (1791–1843), writer on Cornish mining
René Basset (1855–1924), orientalist
Sarah Basset or Sally Bassett (1???–1730), slave in Bermuda executed by burning for attempted murder

See also
Bassett (surname)

References

French-language surnames